The following is a list of ecoregions in Niger, according to the Worldwide Fund for Nature (WWF).

Terrestrial ecoregions
By major habitat type:

Tropical and subtropical grasslands, savannas, and shrublands
Sahelian Acacia savanna
West Sudanian savanna

Flooded grasslands and savannas
Lake Chad flooded savanna

Deserts and xeric shrublands
Sahara desert
South Saharan steppe and woodlands
West Saharan montane xeric woodlands

Freshwater ecoregions
By bioregion:

Nilo-Sudan
Dry Sahel
Lake Chad
Lower Niger-Benue

References
 Burgess, Neil, Jennifer D’Amico Hales, Emma Underwood (2004). Terrestrial Ecoregions of Africa and Madagascar: A Conservation Assessment. Island Press, Washington DC.
 Spalding, Mark D., Helen E. Fox, Gerald R. Allen, Nick Davidson et al. "Marine Ecoregions of the World: A Bioregionalization of Coastal and Shelf Areas". Bioscience Vol. 57 No. 7, July/August 2007, pp. 573–583. 
 Thieme, Michelle L. (2005). Freshwater Ecoregions of Africa and Madagascar: A Conservation Assessment. Island Press, Washington DC.

 
Niger
Niger geography-related lists